Kenneth Hughes may be:
Ken Hughes (1922–2001), British film director, writer, and producer, most famous for writing and directing Chitty Chitty Bang Bang
Kenny Hughes, actor, dancer, director and writer
Ken Hughes (politician) (born 1954), Canadian politician
Ken Hughes (historian), American presidential historian
Ken Hughes (footballer), Welsh footballer
 Kenny Hughes (rugby league) (born 1990), rugby league footballer